The Denjoy integral in mathematics can refer to two closely related integrals connected to the work of Arnaud Denjoy:

 the narrow Denjoy integral, or just Denjoy integral, also known as Henstock–Kurzweil integral,
 the (more general) wide Denjoy integral, or Khinchin integral.